Pikchu (Quechua for pyramid/mountain or prominence with a broad base which ends in sharp peaks, Hispanicized spelling Picchu) is a mountain in the Andes of Peru west of the city of Cusco, about  high. It is located in the Cusco Region, Cusco Province, Cusco District.

Presently there are numerous microwave antennas on top of the mountain.

See also 
 Anawarkhi
 Araway Qhata
 Muyu Urqu
 Pachatusan
 Pillku Urqu
 Sinqa
 Wanakawri

References

Mountains of Peru
Mountains of Cusco Region